Kenneth Rifbjerg Hertsdahl (born April 4, 1973) is a Danish curler and curling coach.

At the national level, he is a five-time Danish men's champion curler (2007, 2008, 2009, 2010, 2015) and a 1999 Danish mixed champion curler.

Personal life
Hertsdahl is married and has three children. He currently lives in Hvidovre.

Teams

Men's

Mixed

Record as a coach of national teams

References

External links

Hertsdahl, Kenneth | Nordic Junior Curling Tour
Kenneth Rifbjerg Hertsdahl - Roller i dansk erhvervsliv
Kenneth Rifbjerg Hertsdahl | TV 2 Lorry
España busca la sorpresa en el Europeo B - Curling - Eurosport

Living people
1973 births
Danish male curlers
Danish curling champions
Danish curling coaches
People from Rødovre
People from Hvidovre Municipality
Sportspeople from the Capital Region of Denmark